Sangaria (Assembly constituency) is one of constituencies of Rajasthan Legislative Assembly in the Ganganagar (Lok Sabha constituency).

Sangaria Constituency covers all voters from Sangaria tehsil and Tibbi tehsil.

References

See also 
 Member of the Legislative Assembly (India)

Hanumangarh district
Assembly constituencies of Rajasthan